The 1959–60 Liga Alef season saw Shimshon Tel Aviv win the title and promotion to Liga Leumit.

Final table

References
Shimshon - Champion of Liga Alef Davar, 22.5.60, Historical Jewish Press 
Previous seasons The Israel Football Association 

Liga Alef seasons
Israel
2